Roy Granville (August 12, 1910 – September 1986) was an American sound engineer. He was nominated for two Academy Awards for Best Special Effects.

Selected filmography
Granville was nominated for two Academy Awards:

 Bombardier (1943)
 Days of Glory (1944)

References

External links

1910 births
1986 deaths
American audio engineers
People from Los Angeles
Engineers from California
20th-century American engineers